The 2010 Papua earthquake occurred on June 16 at 12:16 local time (03:16 UTC) in Papua province of Indonesia. The magnitude 7.0 mainshock was preceded by an  6.2 foreshock 10 minutes earlier, and was followed 42 minutes later by an  6.6 aftershock.

Geology
This part of Indonesia is an area of complex tectonics. The epicenter of the earthquake lies close to the boundary between two proposed microplates, the Bird's Head and Maoke microplates. The motion along this boundary has been modelled as about 80 mm/year sinistral (left lateral) strike-slip. The computed focal mechanism is consistent either with movement on this boundary or on a dextral (right lateral) strike-slip structure conjugate to it.

Damage
The earthquake destroyed nine villages, namely Aiyari, Randawaya, Hamtimoi, Karowaiti, Waita, Waridoni, Tare, Larelahiti and Wabudayar, killed 17 people and injured 75 others, 6 seriously. More than 2,500 houses were destroyed. While Mercalli intensities of VI (Strong) affected the island of Biak, intensities of more than VII (Very strong) affected Serui (on Yapen) and on the neighbouring coast of the mainland. Many buildings were damaged on Yapen Island.

See also
List of earthquakes in 2010
List of earthquakes in Indonesia

References

External links
 Rnzi.com: "Indonesia Yapen Quake death toll rises to 22"
 

2010 Papua
Papua
Papua earthquake
Papua earthquake
Papua
June 2010 events in Indonesia